The New Hampshire Telephone Museum is a nonprofit, telecommunications history museum in Warner, New Hampshire, in the United States. There are over 1,000 telephone-related artifacts in the museum. The museum features switchboards, a large display of rotary phones, candlestick telephones, wooden wall-mount phones, phone booths, princess phones, flip phones and smart devices. Public programs include guided tours, lectures, interactive displays suitable for all ages.

History
The museum was established in 2005 by Dick and Paul Violette, of the Merrimack County Telephone Company. The museum received a grant from the Nancy Sibley Wilkins Town of Warner Trust Fund in 2013. The museum offers a history of telephone communication.

References

External links
Official website

History museums in New Hampshire
Museums established in 2005
Telephone museums
Telecommunications museums in the United States
Museums in Merrimack County, New Hampshire